The Golden Bough is one of the episodic tales written in the epic Aeneid, book VI, by the Roman poet Virgil (70–19 BC), which narrates the adventures of the Trojan hero Aeneas after the Trojan War.

Story
While Troy was being destroyed in its last battle against the Greeks, Aeneas leaves the city and leads a quest to find a new homeland in the western Mediterranean. In this mission, guided by the prophet Helenus, Aeneas arrives in Italy where he intends to found a city for his people. Once there, Deiphobe, the Sibyl of Cumae, then an old woman over seven hundred years old, at the Temple of Apollo, consents to escort him on a journey into the underworld to comply with his wish to see the shade of his deceased father.

Before entering the underworld, Deiphobe tells Aeneas he must first bury the musician Misenus, and also obtain the bough of gold which grows nearby in the woods around her cave, which must be given as a gift to Proserpina, the queen of Pluto, king of the underworld. In the woods, Aeneas's mother, the goddess Venus, sends two doves to aid him in this difficult task, and these help him to find the tree. When Aeneas tears off the bough, a second golden one immediately springs up, which is a good omen, as the sibyl had said that if this did not happen the coming endeavor would fail.

The Trojans, led by Corynaeus, carry out the funerary rites for Misenus, allowing Aeneas to start his descent into the Underworld. The Sibyl shows the golden bough to Charon who only then allows them to enter his boat and cross the Stygian river. On the other side, she casts a drugged cake to the three-headed watchdog Cerberus, who swallows it and falls asleep. Once in the Underworld, Aeneas tries talking to some shades, and listens to the Sibyl speak of places, like Tartarus, where he sees a large prison, fenced by a triple wall, with wicked men being punished, and bordered by the fiery river Phlegethon. At Pluto's palace, Aeneas puts the golden bough on the arched door, and goes through to the Elysian Fields, the abode of those who led just and useful lives.

Anchises, the father of Aeneas, is finally located in the green and sunny Elysium, where the beautiful river Eridanus flows. Aeneas attempts three times to hug his father, but has no success as his father's shade is like thin air, or empty dreams.

In spite of this, they have a happy encounter and Anchises tells his son about the nearby river Lethe, the river of forgetfulness, on the other side of which were a multitude of spirits waiting to be born on Earth. Over there were those who would be the descendants of Aeneas, and those who would live in the future Roman Empire, such as Romulus, Camillus, Marcellus, and the Caesars. Anchises gives advice to Aeneas, and then leads him to the ivory gate, one of the gates of "Sleep", by which they return to Earth.

See also

Dido
Orpheus in the Underworld
The Golden Bough (book)

Footnotes

References

Characters in Book VI of the Aeneid
Roman mythology
Ancient Greek priestesses
Sibyls